"The Ash-tree" is a ghost story by British writer M.R. James, included in his 1904 collection Ghost Stories of an Antiquary.

Plot summary
In 1690, the English county of Suffolk is wracked with a fear of witches. Many girls and women are accused of casting spells and causing mayhem. One such accused woman is a Mrs. Mothersole, a wealthier noblewoman who has property of her own. The only evidence of her witchcraft are eyewitness accounts by Sir Matthew Fell, the owner of a local seat named Castringham. Outside his bedroom window grows a monstrous ash tree, where on moonlit nights he would sometimes supposedly see Mrs. Mothersole climbing the trunk and snipping branches with a dagger. She always escaped and disappeared before he could catch her. Despite her pleas, she is found guilty and hanged. Before the noose is pulled, she dully intones "There will be guests at the Hall". She is buried in the local graveyard.

A few weeks later, Sir Matthew and the local vicar are walking by the ash tree at dusk when they spy a creature in the branches that disappears before they can get a good look. As it is a warm night, the squire leaves his window open. The next day, he is found dead in his bed with a severe look of pain and terror on his face. Though a postmortem is performed, no cause of death can be found.

Sir Matthew's son, Sir Matthew II, inherits Castringham and refuses to stay in his father's bedroom. Over forty years pass and he passes away in 1735. When the family plot in the local graveyard needs to be expanded to fit his remains, Mrs. Mothersole's resting place is exhumed to make room and the coffin is found to be empty, with no body. The locals are puzzled as to who could have robbed the grave.
 
Sir Matthew II's son, Sir Richard, inherits the seat and also refuses to stay in the supposedly cursed bedroom. In 1754, however, he grows tired of the alternative chamber he chose, as it is cold and smoky. He orders his housekeeper to move his bed into the room where his grandfather died decades previously. That night, he keeps his window closed but hears something scratching on it.

The next day, he is visited by the grandson of the vicar from all those years ago, now a vicar himself. They chat about Sir Matthew's death and discover an old Bible of his, where he has written down his desire for the ash tree to be felled. Sir Richard assures the vicar a man from the village will come the next day and dispose of it. He remarks on the strange scratching noises from the window the night previously, blaming the sounds on the branches scraping the glass. The vicar says this is impossible, as the branches don't reach the window. They conclude it must have been a mouse that climbed the ivy.

That evening, several guests arrive for a weekend visit. After a night of pleasantries, everyone retires to their rooms. In the middle of the night, something climbs through Sir Richard's open window and bites him. The next morning, he is found dead in bed and the guests congregate to discover the secret of the tree. A gardener climbs a ladder and peeks into a hollow in the center, seeing something that causes him to drop his lantern in alarm and set the tree ablaze.

The guests watch in horror as countless large, venomous spiders crawl out of the hollow on fire, dying on the grass. An investigation of the tree reveals a cave beneath it with a cavernous spider's nest and the withered skeleton of a woman (presumably the remains of Mrs. Mothersole), dead for at least fifty years.

Adaptations
It was adapted in 1975 by David Rudkin as "The Ash Tree", and was part of the BBC's A Ghost Story for Christmas strand. It was first broadcast on 23 December 1975 at 11.35pm. The adaptation stars Edward Petherbridge as Sir Richard and Barbara Ewing as the witch, Anne Mothersole. It was directed by Lawrence Gordon Clark.

In 2019, a modern-day audio adaptation written by Matthew Holness and starring Amanda Abbington, Reece Shearsmith, and John Sessions was released by Bafflegab Productions.

References

External links

 

1904 short stories
Fiction about curses
Witchcraft in written fiction
Ghosts in written fiction
Horror short stories
Short stories by M. R. James
Short stories adapted into films